Jerry Hopkins is a former professional American football player who played linebacker for six seasons for the Denver Broncos, Miami Dolphins, and Oakland Raiders.

During the West Division Playoffs of 1968, for the Raiders, Hopkins intercepted a pass.

References

1941 births
American football linebackers
Denver Broncos (AFL) players
Miami Dolphins players
Oakland Raiders players
Texas A&M Aggies football players
Living people
American Football League players